The DR Congo national rugby league team are a rugby league team that represents DR Congo at international level. Their first international was a 4–4 draw against Burundi

References

National rugby league teams
Rugby league in Africa
R